Noni, or Morinda citrifolia , is a tree in the family Rubiaceae, or its fruit.

Noni may also refer to:
 Noone language, also called Noni or Nooni, a Bantu language

People 
 Alda Noni (1916–2011), Italian soprano leggiero
 Anika Noni Rose (born 1972), African-American singer and actress
 Noni Hazlehurst (born 1953), Australian actress
 Noni Byrnes, Pakistani analytical chemist
 Noni Ioannidou (born 1958), Greek theatre and stage actress and model
 Noni Jabavu (1919–2008), South African writer and journalist
 Noni Răzvan Ene (born 1992), Romanian singer

See also